Martin Robert McGregor (22 February 1859 – 17 August 1936) was an Australian politician.

He was born in Hobart to merchant Duncan Robert McGregor and Betsy Roberts. He grew up in Melbourne, and became a public servant with the Chief Secretary's Department. After eighteen years in the public service he went to Queensland to work on the land, and ten years later became a farmer at Narracan. On 24 September 1902 he married Agnes Marshall. He served on Narracan Shire Council from 1908 to 1936 and was thrice president (1908–09, 1917–18, 1929–30). In 1922 he was elected to the Victorian Legislative Council for Gippsland Province as a Nationalist. He was a minister without portfolio from March to July 1924 and from 1924 to 1927. McGregor held his seat until his death at Narracan in 1936.

References

1859 births
1936 deaths
Nationalist Party of Australia members of the Parliament of Victoria
United Australia Party members of the Parliament of Victoria
Members of the Victorian Legislative Council